The 1958 RAC Tourist Trophy took place on 13 September, on the Goodwood Circuit, (England).  It was also the sixth and final round of the F.I.A. World Sports Car Championship. This was the first time the RAC Tourist Trophy had taken place since 1955, following the death of three drivers during the race that year.

Report

Entry

A grand total 36 racing cars were registered for this event, of which 29 arrived for practice and qualifying.  Scuderia Ferrari, did entry one car for the event,   250 TR 58, but were among those who did not arrive, perhaps the disinterest from Maranello was due to the lack of drivers and the fact that their victory at Le Mans had given them the Championship. The event also did not attract the Belgian equipes. The entry was therefore headed by the three works Aston Martins, entered under the name of David Brown Ltd. Their DBR1/300s were from Stirling Moss/Tony Brooks, Carroll Shelby/Stuart Lewis-Evans and Roy Salvadori/Jack Brabham.

Qualifying

The Aston Martin DBR1/300 of Stirling Moss took pole position, averaging a speed of 93.913 mph around the 2.4 mile circuit.

Race

Of the 29 starters, only the three Astons were considered the potential winners, and so it proved as they finished in the first three places, winning the Team Awards in the process. The winning partnership of Moss/Brooks won in a time of 4hr 01:17.0mins., averaging a speed of 88.324 mph. They covered a distance of 355.2 miles. Just 0.4 seconds behind came Salvadori/Brabham, with Shelby/Lewis-Evans the same margin adrift in complete the podium.

Official Classification

Class Winners are in Bold text.

 Fastest Lap: Stirling Moss, 1:32.6 secs (93.305 mph)

Class Winners

Standings after the race

References

Goodwood
RAC Tourist Trophy
RAC